The National Broadcasting Company (NBC) has used several corporate logos over the course of its history. The first logo was used in 1926 when the radio network began operations. Its most famous logo, the peacock, was first used in 1956 to highlight the network's color programming. While it has been in use in one form or another for all but four years since then, the peacock did not become part of NBC's main logo until 1979 and did not become the network's sole logo until 1987. The logos were designed by NBC itself. The first logo incorporated design from parent company RCA, and was a unique logo not related to the NBC radio network.

Recent logos have been themed for different holidays during the year (such as Halloween, Valentine's Day, and New Year's Day), in observance of its upcoming or ongoing broadcasts of the Olympics, as well as an American flag-themed logo in the wake of the events of al-Qaeda's terrorist attack on the United States on September 11, 2001. The logo has been adapted for color television and high definition as technology has advanced. As NBC acquired other television channels, the logo branding was adopted to other networks including: CNBC, NBCSN, MSNBC, Golf Channel, and NBC Sports Regional Networks. The logo was also incorporated into the corporate emblem of the network's parent company, NBCUniversal, until Comcast took control of the company in 2011.

Since December 10, 2012, the peacock has been integrated into the corporate logo of Comcast.

Radio network logos (1926–1943)

1926–1931

NBC debuted as a radio network in 1926, with a logo depicting a microphone surrounded by lightning bolts, superimposed over a map of the United States of America. The "NBC" letters appeared in an arc above the graphic.

1931–1943

In 1931, NBC introduced its second logo – a square with a diagonal NBC text in it, and lightning bolts around the "B." This logo was later adopted in 1941 for use as the original logo for the newly formed NBC television network.

Television network logos (1943–1975)

In 1943, NBC introduced its third logo, a microphone surrounded by lightning bolts, which was a modification of the original 1926 logo used by the NBC radio network. Lightning bolts were also part of the logo of corporate parent RCA, as well as that of one-time sister company RKO Pictures. The waves placed on the left side were meant for the radio network, and the right waves were meant for the television network. A network identification featuring this logo includes a male announcer saying "This is NBC, the National Broadcasting Company," followed by the NBC chimes. On the network's flagship television station WNBT (now WNBC), this was accompanied by the same announcer saying "WNBT, New York." At the beginning of telecasts, a card was shown with a different NBC logo with the letters in cursive and enclosed in a rectangle (a logo also used at the end of broadcasts in the early 1950s). This was replaced by another card depicting an NBC cameraman operating an RCA camera was shown underneath the text "NBC Television Presents." The letters "NBC," lighting in tune with the chimes, indicated time for station identification or the end of a telecast.

In 1953, a stylized xylophone and mallet was introduced, symbolizing the NBC chimes, which were first heard on NBC radio in 1927 as a seven-tone sequence. The current tones – which were first adopted in 1929 as a simplified cue for identification of its radio affiliates because of issues with orchestrating the seven notes properly – are only three notes, G, E' and C' (contrary to popular belief, the selection of the three notes was not intended to represent the initials of the network's eventual owner, the General Electric Company, which was an early shareholder in RCA, which itself founded NBC by creating it as a subsidiary). There is some indication that the xylophone logo was used at 5:32 p.m. Eastern Time on December 17, 1953, to announce the Federal Communications Commission's (FCC) approval of the new color standard, which would go into effect 30 days later. This logo debuted in December 1953, during the Tournament of Roses Parade.

Introduction of the Peacock (1956–1959)
 
John J. Graham designed a peacock for the NBC television network: an abstraction of an eleven-feathered peacock indicating richness in color. This brightly hued peacock, which NBC called the "Bird," was adopted because of the increase in color programming. In addition, NBC's owner, RCA, manufactured color television sets. As a result, the peacock became a marketing tool, in the hopes that people tuning in to NBC would purchase color TV sets. NBC's first color broadcasts showed only a still frame of the colorful peacock. Several modifications were made by NBC before the emblem made its first on-air appearance on May 22, 1956.

In the summer of 1957, beginning with Your Hit Parade, the peacock became animated and introduced every NBC color show until a revamped animation appeared in 1962. Its musical backing was a gong while the peacock began its formation, with a male announcer saying "The following program is brought to you in living color on NBC," while the music crescendoed followed by a nine-note flourish while the peacock's feathers changed color and finally spread out. According to Game Show Network executive David Schwartz, the first announcer who spoke those famous words behind the Peacock graphic logo was Ben Grauer, who had been a familiar voice on NBC since 1930. A slide with the letters "NBC" in red, green, and blue respectively and with "TELEVISION" underneath appeared at the end of every color telecast.

Snake logo (1959–1975)

Starting in September 1959, an animated logo joined the Peacock, appearing at the end of every telecast. Starting with the "N," each letter would grow from the other, forming a stacked typographic logo consisting of an "NB" ligature with the "C" forming the base. This would be known as the ”NBC snake.” Several versions of this exist; the first is the snake forming in front of a multicolored background while an RCA TK-40 or TK-41 camera passed by with a jazz rendition of the NBC chimes, while the second consists of the snake forming against a color-changing background, going from blue to green to red, on each note of the regular, automated NBC chimes. The logo was also designed by John J. Graham.

Laramie era: 1962

In 1962, on Laramie, a new version of the Peacock opening logo was introduced in which the bird fanned its bright plumage against a kaleidoscopic color background (with the eleven melded feathers shrinking and separating into the peacock's form). As with the 1956 Peacock, this logo appeared at the start of every NBC color telecast, as all NBC shows eventually began airing in color, it was generally used only to open those shows that were produced by NBC itself, such as The Tonight Show Starring Johnny Carson. It was, however, seen on the NBC airings of The Wizard of Oz as well as on the broadcast of Peter Pan, which had been videotaped at NBC Studios (NBC had previously telecast live versions of Peter Pan in 1955 and 1956 on the anthology Producers' Showcase). The "Laramie Peacock," named for the series which introduced it, used the same "living color" tagline as the first peacock, but the accompanying music was a soft, woodwind-based number, Mel Brandt provided the voiceover. It was revised further in April 1968, the music was slightly rearranged and the animation shortened by a few seconds, Another version, with Vic Roby announcing, "Now, a special program in living color on NBC," was unveiled for use on specials during this same period. It was shortened further in 1975, when the peacock was retired.

The "Laramie Peacock" made special appearances throughout the ensuing years, mostly in a retro-kitsch context or to commemorate a significant broadcast event on NBC. It was used to promote the network's coverage of the NASCAR Cup Series race held at Darlington Raceway in the Florence, South Carolina region from 2015 to 2020, when it was the series' annual throwback round, where many racecars featured a throwback motif. The Peacock also made an appearance before the premiere of The Tonight Show with Conan O'Brien in 2009. The "Laramie Peacock" has also been used by local stations: the sequence was shown at the beginning of Pittsburgh Dad's Guide to Christmas, a special aired on Pittsburgh NBC affiliate WPXI on December 19, 2014.

1975–1986

Trapezoid N Logo (1976–1979) 
NBC updated its image in 1975 with the introduction of an abstract "N," a bold, bright and contemporary design consisting of two trapezoids – one red and one blue. One of the technological innovations of this logo was its use in the first electronically animated ident for an American television network; the trapezoid "N" was previewed in a print ad in October 1975, before it was officially used on-air on January 1, 1976, at the start of the Bicentennial year. On the January 10, 1976 episode of NBC's Saturday Night (now Saturday Night Live), Weekend Update host Chevy Chase mocked the new logo and its $1million design cost.

In February 1976, Nebraska ETV (later Nebraska Educational Telecommunications, now Nebraska Public Media), the PBS member network for Nebraska, filed a trademark infringement lawsuit against NBC. The new NBC logo was virtually identical to the logo that Nebraska ETV had been using since 1974, with the only cosmetic difference between the two designs being that the right trapezoid of the NBC logo had blue coloring. An out-of-court settlement was reached in which NBC gave Nebraska ETV over $800,000 worth of new equipment, including a color mobile unit. It also paid Nebraska ETV $55,000 to cover the cost of designing and implementing a new logo. In return, NBC was allowed to keep the "N" logo.

Proud N Logo (1979–1986) 

The Peacock returned as part of NBC's branding in September 1979. The "N" and the Peacock were combined to create a design called the "Proud N." This marked the first time that the Peacock was actually part of NBC's own logo. It was simplified in keeping with the letter's pared-down design. Although all eleven feathers were intact, the teardrop tips were removed, while a simpler color scheme was used for the feathers themselves (blue for the feather behind the peacock's body; yellow, orange, red, violet and indigo respectively for the other feathers on both sides). The Peacock's body became a simple triangular shape, without any feet. On several occasions, the new Peacock was used independently of the "N," starting with the new "Proud as a Peacock" advertising campaign that reintroduced the Peacock; however, the "N" and the Peacock were usually combined between 1979 and 1986. The 1979 "Proud N" logo was designed by Lippincott & Margulies.

Contrary to popular belief, the Peacock was not originally used as NBC's official primary logo, the 1956 and 1962 versions were used solely to identify the network's color broadcasts, while other logos, initially the xylophone logo but most commonly the NBC snake logo, identified NBC itself. The Peacock became so identified with NBC that it was incorporated into the network logo in 1979 by Fred Silverman, then President of NBC, due to prior research from 1977 in NBC's corporate planning department by Peter H. Kliegman who recommended the station identification value of the Peacock and suggested the Peacock be utilized as a logo. The Peacock became the sole logo in 1986.

Modern Peacock logo (1986–present)

During the finale of the NBC 60th Anniversary Celebration TV special, past and present NBC stars stood on stage to introduce a new logo – a simplified peacock icon, ending the arranged "marriage" of "N" and Peacock (the "Proud N"). Although NBC had been popularly known as "the peacock network" for some time, it was the first time that "The Bird" had been used as NBC's official symbol all by itself. The peacock's head was now flipped to the right – this was done to suggest as if it was looking forward to the future, not back to the past. The 11 feathers of its previous peacock logo were pared down to six to represent NBC's six divisions: News (yellow), Sports (orange), Entertainment (red), Stations (purple), Network (blue), and Productions (green). The shape of the peacock's body was also simplified, becoming vertically elongated, and removing the tips at the bottom and above the head. The little slit in the purple feather is meant to represent the peacock's beak. Incorporating the six primary and secondary colors in the RYB color palette, this Peacock, redesigned by Steff Geissbuhler at Chermayeff & Geismar, remains one of the world's most recognized logos. The network maintains specific guidelines for the logo, including proper colors for reproduction, using either RGB, CMYK, or Pantone colors. The usage guidelines are contained in the NBC Logo Legal Usage Guidelines, which is distributed to NBC employees involved in graphics as well as outside vendors, such as advertising agencies, who may need to use the logo.

After the logo's introduction on May 12, 1986, many of NBC's affiliates (especially the stations part of NBC's O&O group at the time: WNBC-TV in New York City, KNBC-TV in Los Angeles, WMAQ-TV in Chicago, KCNC-TV in Denver, WRC-TV in Washington, D.C., and WKYC-TV in Cleveland) started adding the new peacock to their station identification. However, a few stations still kept the previous "Proud N" from 1979 at least until the end of the 1987–88 television season, and NBC itself retained the "Proud N" in the title sequence for its movie/mini-series presentations. Because of this, the new logo was not universally adopted until the fall of 1988.

This logo's first appearance as an on-screen bug was in the 1993–94 television season, appearing only during the opening sequences of programs, and then staying on-screen throughout the duration of programs as a separate translucent bug beginning with the 1994–95 season. Until the 2004–05 season, the bottom-of-screen logo bug featured a variety of animated effects that built up the image from its components (such as the six feathers rotating into the form of the logo with the peacock's body being formed when the feathers were in place, or a white flag containing the logo wiping the logo bug onto the screen), usually during a show's opening sequence. Until the 2008–09 season, a screensaver-style sequence featuring these logo effects against a black background was also used as a placeholder graphic during slots within commercial breaks allocated for local stations to insert commercials and station promotions. Some NBC affiliates also ran the sequence through the network feed in the event of technical difficulties with inserting local advertising (a placeholder logo graphic remains in use, although since the 2009–10 season, the animation used has changed to match the network's imaging of the current timeframe).

Adaptations
In 1999, NBC revamped its network identity. A new network ID sequence was introduced, with the NBC logo reflecting through very huge glass feathers; however, it was used only for drama shows that year. The glass feathers sequence became the network's sole on-air look in the following year, and until 2002.

Flag variation (2001–2002)
In the aftermath of the September 11 attacks in 2001, NBC introduced a special version of the peacock that replaced the colors with a furled American flag waving within the logo (including within the logo bug); this version was used until the 2002 Winter Olympics.

Adaptation for widescreen/high-definition programming
During programs presented in widescreen, the logo bug would be shrunk and placed to fit within the 16:9 video area (specifically, on the right fringe outside of the safe area). During the 2006–07 television season, this smaller widescreen logo was only used during live broadcasts, such as Saturday Night Live, Christmas at Rockefeller Center (the annual special commemorating the Rockefeller Center Christmas tree lighting), Live Earth and the Macy's Fourth of July Fireworks Spectacular. The smaller logo was reintegrated at the start of the 2007–08 season on all widescreen programming, including pre-recorded standard definition broadcasts in order to insert graphical promos during the show. The network used a variation of its logo bug accompanied by "HD" text for High-definition programming in the 2006–07 season. Live broadcasts in high-definition previously used the logo without "HD" text. Until 2016, the NBC bug was placed within the 4:3 safe area, with the logo bug being displayed identically on the standard definition and high definition feeds (the color version of the NBC logo bug began to be placed within the 4:3 safe area during high definition programming in May 2008). Today, the NBC bug is placed within the 16:9 widescreen frame, again being displayed identically on the SD and HD feeds.

This logo bug is also presented opaque in full color during the opening credits of a program, with the bug sometimes accompanied by ".com" text as a promotion for the network's website. Live finale episodes of The Biggest Loser continued to use the version with the NBC name titling below the peacock until its September 2009 conversion to HD, due to that program's standard definition production being based out of Burbank instead of New York City.

This logo is sometimes accompanied with NBC text, usually below the peacock, however, this is not always the case. The network's logo bug incorporated the text starting in August 1995, and it becomes colorized on September 18, 2006, NBC Nightly News finally began using the 2006 on screen bug starting on March 26, 2007, to coincide with the program's first high-definition broadcast, with the web address for MSNBC (and since 2012, NBC News) later added to the right side during the program. Programs broadcast in 4:3 SD continued to use the translucent version of the logo until September 13, 2009. Some NBC Sports programs, such as golf and Olympic sports, use a bug incorporating the Olympic rings below the peacock; this version is also used on entertainment and news programming, starting with the beginning of the fall television season in the lead-up to the Winter Olympics, or at the beginning of a calendar year leading up to the Summer Olympics (in 2012, the rings variant was implemented on April 16, 2012, in accordance with "Green is Universal" week, along with sister network Telemundo). The Olympics version of the network's 1986 logo is also used by NBC affiliates for their logos during the network's coverage of the Games (as well as in promotions for the Olympics that precede the start of the Games), both on-air for some stations or confined to the "Olympic Zone" micro-sites.

2006–2007
Shortly after the beginning of the 2006–07 television season, almost all NBC programming included graphics for Today, Meet the Press, and Dateline NBC. The left version was less embossed than the one used previously and did not display the NBC acronym beneath it. After the beginning of the 2009–10 season on September 28, 2009, as part of the lead-up to the 2010 Winter Olympics in Vancouver, the Olympics variant of the on-screen logo was used on all network programming, except for news.

Since December 2007, NBC occasionally places a text-based advertisement for an upcoming program above or next to the NBC peacock, which is present on both the SD and HD feeds.

2008
NBC updated its logo once again in January 2008, with all network promos and IDs ending with the peacock feathers zoom out and spin before placing themselves to form the logo. The feathers also popped in tune to the NBC chimes, which were sometimes played using different instruments other than the standard xylophone, or other sounds set to G-E-C (such as a telephone for promos for The Office, or the ringing of a cash register in promos for Deal or No Deal). Two versions of the 2008 logo animation were used: a 3D glass version that was used in most promos, and an occasionally used 3D metal logo that was also used as a generic ID. The ".com" suffix added to create the URL for promoting the network's website was sometimes featured beside the logo.

2009–2022 

In 2009, with the introduction of the network's "More Colorful" image campaign, the network incorporated a flickering effect for the NBC peacock – seen at the end of promos and ID sequences – in which the logo cycles through all six colors before switching to the standard multi-colored logo, usually displayed next to a clip featuring a main character or host of a particular program.

In 2013, NBC changed its wordmark to use Sweet Sans Pro.

In 2018, NBC changed its wordmark to use a new in-house typeface, "Tinker".

2022–present

In the 2022–23 television season, NBC began to phase in an updated version of the peacock symbol, with its colors made brighter to match the logo of NBCUniversal's streaming service Peacock, the feathers repositioned to make them more "balanced", the peacock's "beak" made larger and more prominent, and white-outlined versions no longer being used. The wordmark typeface was also emboldened.

The updated peacock was soft launched in September 2022 within the new logo for Sunday Night Football, and began to appear in promos for its holiday programming in November 2022. A new brand identity by design agency Sibling Rivalry began to be introduced on-air in late-December 2022 ahead of NBC's midseason lineup, with an official launch occurring on December 31, 2022. Other NBC divisions will be updated to the new logo at a later date.

Other variations
In the early 1950s, the bold upper case NBC letters (later used in the 1953 "Xylophone" logo) were also used as an animated "light-up letters" logo in synchronization with the NBC chimes in front of a gray background. This closing sequence was edited in at the end of a network program. Another variant was later used with a darker gray background and a disclaimer underneath the light-up letters: "This program was reproduced by the Kinephoto process," a reference to a live program put onto black and white film identified as a Kinescope recording. This variant was widely used throughout the 1950s and 1960s. Many programs were originally recorded in this manner before the advent of two-inch videotape. NBC, however, continued to use its Kinephoto recording system to archive many of its videotaped programs so the videotapes can be erased and reused for other programming. This is evident with such 1960s programs as Hullabaloo using both archived Kinescope footage with rare color videotape finds, which was later re-released for home video on VHS and DVD.

For NBC's 1965 fall preview special, the peacock introduction began as normal with announcer Mel Brandt's standard introduction; however, when the peacock faded, Brandt is heard saying "It just starts in black and white!" Used to begin the special, the variant – with the voice-over being featured at the beginning of the ident, instead of during the middle – led into almost the complete pre-title teaser of Get Smart’s pilot episode, which was shot in black-and-white. This variant is also known as the "Pink Peacock" on video-sharing websites such as YouTube due to the faded color of the video.

On October 24, 1967, NBC was the first American television network to air The Beatles' film A Hard Day's Night, but as it was filmed in black and white because color television was not fully implemented at that time in the band's home country, United Kingdom. NBC had to temporarily replace the peacock: a caption showing I Dream of Jeannie and The Jerry Lewis Show (the programs NBC was pre-empting that night) was pushed off-screen by an animated, waddling penguin adorned with a top hat that flapped its flightless wings (imitating the peacock), accompanied by announcer Mel Brandt drolly saying "I Dream of Jeannie and The Jerry Lewis Show will not be seen tonight. Instead... (music cue) The following very, very special program is brought to you in lively black and white, on NBC." At the end of the sequence, the penguin is shown taking off its top hat and unzipping its chest, with The Beatles jumping out and performing, before running away while being chased by fangirls.

In 1968, a variant of the 1965 "in living color" peacock ID was featured at the start of an episode of Rowan & Martin's Laugh-In. At the very end of the sequence, the peacock sneezes, sending its feathers flying off-screen, after which the puzzled peacock is shown looking in each direction in notice that its feathers are missing. This clip was later re-used in 1985 to open an episode of TV's Bloopers & Practical Jokes, and in the 2002 special The Most Outrageous Game Show Moments 2. The sneezing peacock was only an animation added onto the end of the original clip of the 1965 peacock ID, as the peacock's feathers became brighter upon switching to the portion in which it sneezed.

In 1993, NBC commissioned several artists such as Al Hirschfeld, Peter Max, John Kricfalusi, J. J. Sedelmaier, David Daniels, Joan C. Gratz, and Mark Malmberg to devise abstract variations of the peacock for promotional use. However, the Gratz bumper was first used in 1992. Animated versions of the Hirschfeld, Sedelmeier, Gratz, and Kricfalusi peacocks acted as stings, and continued to air on the network until 2002.

The current peacock logo was also used as a part of an occasional sketch on Late Night with Conan O'Brien called "Polly the NBC Peacock,” where a cardboard cut-out of the peacock logo with an added marionette-like mouth known as Polly (with an obvious talking parrot voice) mocked the ratings moves and celebrities of competitor networks, along with NBC's lesser programming.

Chermayeff and Geismar's book Identify includes the original sketches for the current peacock logo.

See also
 American Broadcasting Company logos
 PBS idents

References

External links

 The Story behind the design of the NBC Peacock
 Animated versions of the NBC Peacock and other network logos

NBC
NBC
National Broadcasting Company
NBC